Omari Aldridge (born 6 February 1984) is a professional footballer who last played as a striker for Sporting Khalsa.

Club career
Born in Canada, he has played college soccer for Saint Francis University and the Bowling Green Falcons. In February 2008 he signed a full season contract to play for Beijing Hongdeng

International career
A pacy forward, Aldridge made his debut for Saint Vincent and the Grenadines in a January 2008 friendly match against Guyana and earned his second cap 2 weeks later against Grenada.

References

External links
 Player profile – BG Falcons

1984 births
Living people
People from Coquitlam
Soccer people from British Columbia
Canadian soccer players
Canadian people of Saint Vincent and the Grenadines descent
People with acquired Saint Vincent and the Grenadines citizenship
Saint Vincent and the Grenadines footballers
Association football forwards
Saint Francis University alumni
Bowling Green Falcons men's soccer players
Ottawa Fury (2005–2013) players
Sporting Khalsa F.C. players
USL League Two players
China League One players
Saint Vincent and the Grenadines international footballers
Canadian expatriate soccer players
Canadian expatriate sportspeople in the United States
Canadian expatriate sportspeople in China
Saint Vincent and the Grenadines expatriate footballers
Saint Vincent and the Grenadines expatriate sportspeople in the United States
Saint Vincent and the Grenadines expatriate sportspeople in China
Expatriate soccer players in the United States
Expatriate footballers in China